Bulbine praemorsa is a species of geophyte in the genus Bulbine. It is also known by the Afrikaans names Blougif, Slymstok, and Slymuintjie.

Distribution 
Bulbine praemorsa is not endemic to South Africa, but is found in the Cape Provinces, from Namaqualand to Bredasdorp.

Conservation status 
Bulbine praemorsa is classified as Least Concern.

References

External links 
 

Flora of South Africa
Flora of Southern Africa
Flora of the Cape Provinces
Plants described in 1825
Taxa named by Kurt Polycarp Joachim Sprengel
praemorsa